Alison Moore is a British Labour politician and current Mayor of Barnet Council. Moore served as a member of the London Assembly from March 2020 to May 2021.

Political career 
Moore has been a councillor on Barnet London Borough Council since 1998 for the East Finchley ward. Moore is a former Leader of the Labour Group on Barnet Council. She also stood as the Labour candidate for Finchley and Golders Green in 2010.

Moore took over the seat of Tom Copley, who resigned from the Assembly following his appointment as Deputy Mayor for Housing and Residential Development by Sadiq Khan. She was co-opted into the Assembly along with Murad Qureshi. She did not stand for re-election in the 2021 London Assembly election.

Councillor Alison Moore has become the 57th Mayor of Barnet after being officially sworn in during the Annual Council Meeting held on Tuesday 24 May at Hendon town Hall.

Committee assignments 
Moore has the following assignments in the 2020-21 session:

 Chair of the Transport Committee 
 Member of the Audit Panel
 Member of the Budget and Performance Committee
 Member of the Confirmation Hearings Committee
 Member of the Fire, Resilience and Emergency Planning Committee

Electoral history

References

External links 
 Moore's biography on the website of Barnet London Borough Council
 Twitter

Living people
Labour Members of the London Assembly
People from the London Borough of Barnet
People from Finchley
Year of birth missing (living people)
Politicians from London
Women councillors in England